Charles Manning Reed Mansion, also known as the Erie Club, is a historic home / clubhouse located at Erie, Erie County, Pennsylvania. The original section of the 2 1/2-story, brick mansion was built between 1846 and 1849. It was expanded with a one-story bay about 1855, a two-story bay about 1865, and a two-story extension in 1970. The front facade features a pedimented portico with four two-story, fluted Ionic order columns in the Greek Revival style. Connected to the house is a one-story, recreation hall measuring 20 feet wide and 120 feet long, with an addition built about 1920. Its builder was a descendant of the first permanent settler of Erie, Colonel Set Reed. The Erie Club purchased the property in 1904.

It was added to the National Register of Historic Places in 1982.  It is located in the West Sixth Street Historic District.

References

External links
 Erie Club website
 Reed Mansion, West Sixth & Peach Streets, Erie, Erie County, PA: 17 photos and 4 data pages, at Historic American Buildings Survey

Historic American Buildings Survey in Pennsylvania
Clubhouses on the National Register of Historic Places in Pennsylvania
Greek Revival houses in Pennsylvania
Houses completed in 1849
Houses in Erie, Pennsylvania
1849 establishments in Pennsylvania
National Register of Historic Places in Erie County, Pennsylvania